Briar Thicket is an unincorporated community in Cocke County, Tennessee, United States.

The historic Conway Bridge is located near Briar Thicket.

Notes

Unincorporated communities in Cocke County, Tennessee
Unincorporated communities in Tennessee